Narcisse can be both a given name and surname. Notable people with the name include:

Given name
 Narcisse Bambara (born 1989), Burkinabé footballer
 Narcisse Blais (1812–1888), Canadian farmer and political figure in Quebec
 Narcisse Bonan (born 1984), Ivorian footballer
 Narcisse Chaillou (1835–1916), French painter
 Narcisse Ekanga (born 1987), Cameroonian-born Equatoguinean footballer
 Narcisse Fish Abada (born 1982), Cameroonian footballer
 Narcisse Fournier (1809–1880), French journalist, novelist and playwright
 Narcisse Girard (1797–1860), French violinist, conductor and composer
 Narcisse Leven (1833–1915), French lawyer
 Narcisse Théophile Patouillard (1854–1926), French pharmacist and mycologist
 Narcisse Parant (1794–1842), French lawyer and Minister of Public Education
 Narcisse Pérodeau (1851–1932), fourteenth Lieutenant-Governor of Quebec
 Narcisse Virgilio Díaz (1807–1876), French painter
 Narcisse Yaméogo (born 1980), Burkinabé footballer

Surname
 Antonio Narcisse (born 1982), American football player
 Clairvius Narcisse (20th century), Haitian man said to have been turned into a living zombie
 Daniel Narcisse (born 1979), French handball player
 Don Narcisse (20th century), Canadian football wide receiver

See also
Narcissus (plant)
 Joseph-Narcisse
 Narcisse-Achille
 Narcisse-Fortunat
 Pierre-Narcisse
 Saint-Narcisse (disambiguation)

French unisex given names
Given names derived from plants or flowers